The Messinian is in the geologic timescale the last age or uppermost stage of the Miocene. It spans the time between 7.246 ± 0.005 Ma and 5.333 ± 0.005 Ma (million years ago). It follows the Tortonian and is followed by the Zanclean, the first age of the Pliocene.

The Messinian overlaps the Turolian European Land Mammal Mega Zone (more precisely MN 12 and 13) and the Pontian Central European Paratethys Stage. It also overlaps the late Huayquerian and early Montehermosan South American Land Mammal Ages, and falls inside the more extensive Hemphillian North American Land Mammal Age.

During the Messinian, around 6 million years ago, the Messinian salinity crisis took place, which brought about repeated desiccations of the Mediterranean Sea.

Definition

The Messinian was introduced by Swiss stratigrapher Karl Mayer-Eymar in 1867. Its name comes from the Italian city of Messina on Sicily, where the Messinian evaporite deposit is of the same age.

The base of the Messinian is at the first appearance of the planktonic foram species Globorotalia conomiozea and is stratigraphically in the middle of magnetic chronozone C3Br.1r. The Global Boundary Stratotype Section and Point for the Messinian is located in a section at Oued Akrech, near the Moroccan capital Rabat.

The top of the Messinian (the base of the Zanclean Stage and Pliocene Series) lies with the top of magnetic chronozone Cr3 (about 100,000 years before the Thvera normal subchronozone C3n.4n). The top is also close to the extinction level of the calcareous nanoplankton species Triquetrorhabdulus rugosus (the base of biozone CN10b) and the first appearance of nanoplankton Ceratolithus acutus.

References

Sources

External links

GeoWhen Database - Messinian
Messinian online - living in an evaporitic world - Mediterranean area
Neogene timescale, at the website of the subcommission for stratigraphic information of the ICS
 Neogene timescale at the website of the Norwegian network of offshore records of geology and stratigraphy

 
06
 
Miocene geochronology
Geological ages